The Krottenkopf, is a peak in the Ester Mountains and the highest mountain in the Bavarian Prealps. It lies within the Bavarian district of Garmisch-Partenkirchen.

Location and climbing options 
It lies in the westernmost part of the Bavarian Prealps in the Ester Mountains near the town of Garmisch-Partenkirchen. Immediately below and a half an hour from the summit is the Weilheimer Hut, the highest Alpine Club hut in the Bavarian Prealps.

There are four climbing options:
 From Oberau a very steep climb, the Oberauer Steig, follows narrow mountain paths via the Frickenboden and later runs past the Bischof mountain, which is also over 2,000 metres high, but less well known. This climb requires about 4 hours.
 From Klais another path runs via the Krüner Alm and the Michelfeld
 From Garmisch-Partenkirchen and Farchant the route goes via the Esterbergalm taking about 4½ hours to reach the top of the Krottenkopf.
 In addition, there is the even longer climb from Eschenlohe past the  Hohe Kisten to the summit.

Gallery

See also
List of mountains of the Alps
List of Alpine peaks by prominence

References

External links 

 Tour description
 Tour description in winter with photos
 Annotated summit panorama from theKrottenkopf
 Description of tour via the Oberauer Steig incl. map and photos

Two-thousanders of Germany
Mountains of the Alps
Mountains of Bavaria
Bavarian Prealps
Garmisch-Partenkirchen (district)